Angèle Diabang Brener is a Senegalese screenwriter, director and film producer.

Early life and education
Angèle Diabang Brener was born in Dakar in 1979. Her training and education in film making took place in Dakar at the Média Centre de Dakar, subsequently at the French state film school La Fémis in Paris, and then at the renowned Filmakademie Baden-Württemberg in Germany.

Career
She began her career as a film editor then in 2005 she directed her first film, a documentary on the beauty standards for Senegalese women entitled "Mon beau sourire". She runs the production company Karoninka which is credited with over a dozen films.

Filmography 
2005 : Mon beau sourire
2007 : L’Homme est le remède de l’homme, with Ousseynou Ndiaye and El Hadji Mamadou "Leuz" Niang
2007 : Le Revers de l'exil 
2007 : Sénégalaises et Islam
2008 : Yandé Codou, la griotte de Senghor
2014 : Congo, un médecin pour sauver les femmes A documentary on the work of Dr Denis Mukwege.

Awards
 For Sénégalaises et Islam
 2007. Jury Prize at Festival Images citoyennes (Liège, Belgium)
 2007. Mention Speciale at the Apt Festival of African Films Festival (Apt, France)

See also 

Cinema of Senegal
List of Senegalese films
Women in Senegal

References

Further reading
 Françoise Pfaff, 'Angèle Diabang Brener', in À l'écoute du cinéma sénégalais, Éditions L'Harmattan, Paris, 2010, pp. 109–119, 

1979 births
Living people
Senegalese women film directors
Senegalese film directors